Jacek Markiewicz (born 18 June 1976 in Białystok) is a Polish footballer.

External links
 

1976 births
Living people
Polish footballers
Sportspeople from Białystok
Association football defenders
Jagiellonia Białystok players
RKS Radomsko players
Korona Kielce players
Ekstraklasa players